Copelemur is a genus of adapiform primate that lived in North America during the early Eocene.

References

Bibliography 

 

Prehistoric strepsirrhines
Prehistoric primate genera
Eocene primates
Ypresian life
Wasatchian
Eocene mammals of North America
Paleontology in Colorado
Paleontology in New Mexico
Paleontology in Wyoming
Fossil taxa described in 1877